A person's Erdős–Bacon number is the sum of one's Erdős number—which measures the "collaborative distance" in authoring academic papers between that person and Hungarian mathematician Paul Erdős—and one's Bacon number—which represents the number of links, through roles in films, by which the person is separated from American actor Kevin Bacon. The lower the number, the closer a person is to Erdős and Bacon, which reflects a small world phenomenon in academia and entertainment.

To have a defined Erdős–Bacon number, it is necessary to have both appeared in a film and co-authored an academic paper, although this in and of itself is not sufficient as ones co-authors must have a known chain leading to Paul Erdős, and one's film must have actors eventually leading to Kevin Bacon.

Academic scientists
Mathematician Daniel Kleitman has an Erdős–Bacon number of 3. He co-authored papers with Erdős and has a Bacon number of 2 via Minnie Driver in Good Will Hunting; Driver and Bacon appeared together in Sleepers.

Like Kleitman, mathematician Bruce Reznick has co-authored a paper with Erdős and has a Bacon number of 2, via Roddy McDowall in the film Pretty Maids All in a Row, giving him an Erdős–Bacon number of 3 as well.

Physicist Nicholas Metropolis has an Erdős number of 2, and also a Bacon number of 2, giving him an Erdős–Bacon number of 4.

Physicists Nicholas Metropolis and Richard Feynman both worked on the Manhattan Project at Los Alamos Laboratory. Via Metropolis, Feynman has an Erdős number of 3 and, from having appeared in the film Anti-Clock alongside Tony Tang, Feynman also has a Bacon number of 3. Richard Feynman thus has an Erdős–Bacon number of 6.

Theoretical physicist Stephen Hawking has an Erdős–Bacon number of 6: his Bacon number of 2 (via his appearance alongside John Cleese in Monty Python Live (Mostly), who acted alongside Kevin Bacon in The Big Picture) is lower than his Erdős number of 4.

Similarly to Stephen Hawking, scientist Carl Sagan has an Erdős–Bacon number of 6, also from a Bacon number of 2 and an Erdős number of 4.

Mathematician Jordan Ellenberg has an Erdős number of 3 and a Bacon number of 2 due to a cameo appearance in the film Gifted for which he was also the mathematical consultant

Actors
Danica McKellar, who played Winnie Cooper in The Wonder Years, has an Erdős–Bacon number of 6. While an undergraduate at the University of California, Los Angeles, McKellar coauthored a mathematics paper with Lincoln Chayes, who via his wife Jennifer Tour Chayes has an Erdős number of 3, giving McKellar one of 4. Having worked with Margaret Easley, McKellar has a Bacon number of 2.

Israeli-American actress Natalie Portman has an Erdős–Bacon number of 7. She collaborated (using her birth name, Natalie Hershlag) with Abigail A. Baird, who has a collaboration path leading to Joseph Gillis, who has an Erdős number of 1, giving Portman an Erdős number of 5. Portman appeared in A Powerful Noise Live (2009) with Sarah Michelle Gellar, who appeared in The Air I Breathe (2007) with Bacon, giving Portman a Bacon number of 2.

British actor Colin Firth has an Erdős–Bacon number of 6. Firth is credited as co-author of a neuroscience paper, "Political Orientations Are Correlated with Brain Structure in Young Adults", after he suggested on BBC Radio 4 that such a study could be done. Another author of that paper, Geraint Rees, has an Erdős number of 4, which gives Firth an Erdős number of 5. Firth's Bacon number of 1 is due to his appearance in Where the Truth Lies.

Kristen Stewart has an Erdős–Bacon number of 7; she is credited as a co-author on an artificial intelligence paper that was written after a technique was used for her short film Come Swim, giving her an Erdős number of 5, and she co-starred with Michael Sheen in Twilight, who co-starred with Bacon in Frost/Nixon, giving her a Bacon number of 2.

Others
Elon Musk, who is neither a scientist nor an actor, has an Erdős–Bacon number of 6. In 2010 Musk had a cameo in the film Iron Man 2. Since actor Mickey Rourke played a role in both Iron Man 2 and in Diner where also Kevin Bacon played a role, Musk has a Bacon number of 2. In 2021 Musk coauthored a peer-reviewed scientific paper on COVID-19 together with Pardis Sabeti, among others. Since Sabeti has an Erdős number of 3, Musk has an Erdős number of 4 and consequently an Erdős–Bacon number of 6.

Table

Notes:

References

Mathematics literature
Separation numbers
Bacon Number
Mathematics and culture